Michaela Tabb (born 11 December 1967, in Bath, Somerset, England) is a Scottish snooker and pool referee. She established significant milestones for female officials in professional cue sports, beginning in pool, where she officiated at top tournaments such as the WPA World Nine-ball Championship and the Mosconi Cup. She qualified in 2001 to referee on the World Snooker Tour and went on to become the sport's highest profile female referee, officiating on tour for 14 years. She became the first woman to officiate at a professional ranking snooker tournament at the 2002 Welsh Open, and the first woman to referee a ranking tournament final at the 2007 Welsh Open. As of 2022, she is the only woman to have refereed the World Snooker Championship final, which she did in 2009 and 2012.

Her professional snooker refereeing career came to an end when she left the tour in March 2015. She subsequently brought a court case against World Snooker Ltd, alleging sex discrimination, unfair dismissal, and breach of contract. An out-of-court settlement was reached in September 2015, under which World Snooker Ltd paid her an undisclosed sum. In addition to her refereeing career, Tabb is also a former player on the women's eight-ball pool circuit, where she won a number of titles as a solo competitor and as a member, and later captain, of the Scottish Ladies' Pool Team.

Personal life
Born on 11 December 1967, in Bath, England, Tabb moved to Scotland with her family when she was three years old. She studied chemistry, biology, and psychology at the University of Glasgow, although she dropped out before receiving her degree. Before becoming a full-time professional referee, she worked as a sales representative for a number of blue-chip companies. She was also a sales representative for the Ann Summers lingerie retailer. Tabb resides in Dunfermline, Scotland, with her husband, pool player Ross McInnes, and their two children, Morgan and Preston.

Playing career
Tabb started playing competitive blackball in 1991, at the age of 23. Selected the following year to play on the Scottish Ladies' Pool Team, she went on to captain the team to two consecutive Grand Slam titles in 1997 and 1998 by winning the Nations Cup, European Championships, and World Championships in the same season. She remained on the team until 2003. Her sister Juliette also played on the Scottish ladies' team. As an individual competitor, Tabb won the UK women's singles title in 1997. The following year, she won the European Pool Championships held in Gibraltar.

Refereeing career

Pool
Tabb began refereeing in the mid-1990s when she and her husband, Ross McInnes, began running amateur eight-ball and nine-ball pool tournaments. McInnes subsequently encouraged her to pursue refereeing professionally. She made her professional refereeing debut at the St. Andrew's Cup nine-ball pool tournament in September 1997, while pregnant with her first son. She refereed on television for the first time the following year, when the 1998 St. Andrew's Cup, sponsored by Matchroom Sport, was broadcast on Sky Sports. She went on to become one of pool's top officials, refereeing at the WPA World Nine-ball Championship and the Mosconi Cup. In 2017 Tabb became the head referee on the World Pool Series.

Snooker

Stating that he wanted to change the dowdy, all-male image of snooker referees, Jim McKenzie, then chief executive of the World Professional Billiards and Snooker Association, recruited Tabb to referee snooker events in 2001. Exempted from the customary five-year refereeing apprenticeship, she qualified as a Class 3 snooker referee in September 2001. She conceded that this fast-tracking generated resentment among her fellow officials and referees.

On 23 January 2002, Tabb became the first woman to referee at a professional ranking snooker tournament when she took charge of a first-round match between Ken Doherty and James Wattana at the 2002 Welsh Open in Newport. The following year, she made her World Snooker Championship debut at the Crucible Theatre in Sheffield, refereeing a first-round match between Mark King and Drew Henry. In July 2003, dwindling sponsorship revenue forced the WPBSA to cut its tournament referees from ten to eight. Tabb's contract, along with that of Dutch referee Johan Oomen, was terminated on a last-in, first-out basis, threatening her future in the sport. However, the WPBSA soon reversed its decision to dismiss Tabb and she signed a new contract in September 2003.

On 18 February 2007, Tabb became the first woman to officiate at a ranking event final, taking charge as Neil Robertson defeated Andrew Higginson 9–8 to win the Welsh Open. On 20 January 2008, she refereed her first Triple Crown final at the 2008 Masters, which saw Mark Selby defeat Stephen Lee 10–3. On 5 April 2009, she took charge of the China Open final in Beijing, where Peter Ebdon beat John Higgins 10–8.

Tabb became the first woman to referee a World Snooker Championship final in 2009, officiating as John Higgins defeated Shaun Murphy 18–9 to capture his third world title. She also refereed the 2012 World Snooker Championship final, in which Ronnie O'Sullivan defeated Ali Carter 18–11 to win his fourth world title. As of 2022, she remains the only female referee to have officiated at a world championship final.

On 19 March 2015, World Snooker Ltd announced that Tabb had left the professional refereeing circuit. In September 2015, appearing under her married name of Michaela McInnes, Tabb brought an Employment Tribunal against World Snooker Ltd, claiming sexual discrimination, unfair dismissal and breach of contract. World Snooker Ltd made an undisclosed out-of-court financial settlement. Since leaving the main professional circuit, she has continued to referee World Seniors Tour events, including the World Seniors Championship finals in 2019, 2020 and 2022.

See also

References

External links

  (Archived copy from February 2011 at archive.org)
 Michaela's Mosconi Cue Club International, 12 August 2010 (Archived)

1967 births
Living people
Sportspeople from Bath, Somerset
People from Dunfermline
Pool referees and officials
Snooker referees and officials
Alumni of the University of Glasgow
Scottish pool players
Scottish women referees and umpires
Scottish people of English descent